Pterygodermatites is a genus of parasitic nematodes in the family Rictulariidae. Their life-cycle is complex. Species include:
Pterygodermatites baiomydis Lynggaard, García-Prieto, Guzmán-Cornejo & Osorio-Sarabia, 2014 
Pterygodermatites jagerskiöldi 
Pterygodermatites kozeki 
 Pterygodermatites mexicana Caspeta-Mandujano et al., 2013  
Pterygodermatites nycticebi (Mönnig, 1920) 
Pterygodermatites ondatrae 
Pterygodermatites peromysci 
 Pterydodermatites quentini Diouf et al., 2013 
Pterygodermatites valladaresi Miquel, Martín-Carrillo, Ribas, Sanchez-Vicente, Feliu & Foronda, 2022

Undescribed species have been recorded from the marsh rice rat in Florida and from Oryzomys gorgasi in Venezuela.

See also 
 List of parasites of the marsh rice rat

References

Literature cited 

Spirurida